Viktor Aleksandrovich Demyanov (born 10 June 1999) is a Russian football player who plays for FC Irtysh Omsk.

Club career
He made his debut in the Russian Football National League for FC Baltika Kaliningrad on 16 August 2020 in a game against FC Shinnik Yaroslavl.

References

External links
 
 Profile by Russian Football National League
 

1999 births
Footballers from Moscow
Living people
Russian footballers
Russia youth international footballers
Association football midfielders
FC Dynamo Moscow reserves players
FC Baltika Kaliningrad players
FC Volgar Astrakhan players
FC Irtysh Omsk players
Russian First League players
Russian Second League players